Mitra Institution (Main) is one of the heritage schools of Kolkata, West Bengal, teaching grades one to twelve under the West Bengal Board of Secondary Education and the West Bengal Council of Higher Secondary Education. The school premises are situated at 60-B Surya Sen Street, near Sealdah. There is a different co-educational primary and a girls school section up to class X.

History
The school was established by Babu Bisweswar Mitra on 5 January 1898. Initially it started with only five students. In 1901, Raja Peary Mohan Mukherjee became the first President of the school. After the recognition of Calcutta University in 1904, the school became famous. Sir Ashutosh Mukherjee and Sir Alexander Pedlar, the then Vice Chancellor, helped the institution to grant affiliation of the university. Bipin Chandra Pal, Gopal Krishna Gokhale, Sir Bhupendra Nath Bose, Amritlal Bose visited Mitra Institution (Main) and became involved with its affairs.

Mitra Institution (Bhowanipur Branch)
MITRA INSTITUTION (BHOWANIPUR BRANCH) was established in 1905 by Asutosh Mookerjee and Bisweswar Mitra and it is managed by the Department of Education, Government of West Bengal. It is located in Urban area. It is located in KOLKATA MUNICIPALITY block of KOLKATA, West Bengal. The school consists of Grades from 5 to 12. The school is Boys and it doesn't have an attached pre-primary section. Bengali is the medium of instructions in this school. The school has Rent Free Building building. It has got 22 classrooms for instructional purposes. It has 2 other rooms for non-teaching activities. The school has 7 boys toilet and it is functional. The school has a playground. The school has a library and has 400 books in its library. The school has 26 computers for teaching and learning purposes and all are functional.

References

External links 
 

Schools in Colonial India
Primary schools in West Bengal
High schools and secondary schools in West Bengal
Schools in Kolkata
Educational institutions established in 1898
1898 establishments in India